Posidonius is a lunar impact crater that is located on the north-eastern edge of Mare Serenitatis, to the south of Lacus Somniorum. It was named after ancient Greek philosopher and geographer Posidonius of Apamea. The crater Chacornac is attached to the southeast rim, and to the north is Daniell.

Description
The rim of Posidonius is shallow and obscured, especially on the western edge, and the interior has been overlain by a lava flow in the past. The crater ramparts can still be observed to the south and east of the crater rim, and to a lesser degree to the north.

There is a smaller, semi-circular rim of a concentric, flooded crater within the main rim, offset towards the eastern edge. There is no central peak, but the floor is hilly and laced with a rille system named the Rimae Posidonius. The floor is also slightly bulged due to the past lava uplift, which also likely produced the complex of rilles. The northeast rim is interrupted by the smaller crater Posidonius B. Within the crater rim, offset just to the west of center is another smaller crater Posidonius A.

On the Mare Serenitatis surface near Posidonius is a notable system of wrinkle ridges that parallel the nearby shore. These are designated the Dorsa Smirnov. At the peak of these ridges is a small crater, Posidonius Y, with a diameter of 2 km. This crater is surrounded by a patch of high-albedo material, its ray system. This peak was formerly designated Posidonius Gamma (γ).

Posidonius Gamma was first observed by the lunar cartographer Julius Schmidt in 1867, who noted the similarity to the bright patch surrounding the crater Linné.

Satellite craters
By convention these features are identified on lunar maps by placing the letter on the side of the crater midpoint that is closest to Posidonius.

References

External links

Lunar Reconnaissance Orbiter pages with images:
 - especially on the rille Rimae Posidonius

Impact craters on the Moon